Christian Hayner (born 14 October 1965) is a Swiss sailor. He competed in the Star event at the 1988 Summer Olympics.

References

External links
 

1965 births
Living people
Swiss male sailors (sport)
Olympic sailors of Switzerland
Sailors at the 1988 Summer Olympics – Star
Place of birth missing (living people)
20th-century Swiss people